The Big Bureau Creek is a  tributary of the Illinois River in north central Illinois. Among the creek's more notable features is the Red Covered Bridge, built in 1863, which passes over Big Bureau Creek and was once part of the Peoria Galena Trail. The bridge, located just north of Interstate 80, is listed on the National Register of Historic Places.

Ecology

Currently, there is an effort underway to maintain this watershed as well to evaluate its current condition with the Big Bureau Creek Watershed Inventory and Evaluation (I&E) begun in 2003 (See the Forward and Acknowledgment section for the year 2003).  Nitrogen levels from surrounding farmland, sedimentation, and low water levels are the main problems to be assessed.

History 
The stream is named for Michel or Pierre Bureau. Their original surname was probably Belleau, but local aboriginals may have had difficulty pronouncing the "l" sound. One or both of the brothers ran a trading post near where Big Bureau Creek empties into the Illinois River from 1776 until 1780 or 1790. The stream was called the Chassagauch", "Chassagoach", or "Chachagouche" River on early maps of the region. These are European renderings of the Miami-Illinois language word , which once meant 'copperhead' (agkistrodon contortrix) but now means 'garter snake'.  was also the name of a chief and diplomat of the Kaskaskia at the Grand Village of the Illinois, up river from Starved Rock, in the late 17th and early 18th centuries.

Recreation 

Most land surrounding the banks of the Big Bureau Creek is privately owned.  Canoeing on the creek is possible in some areas.  There have been reports of class II and III rapids in high water. Brush buildup, beaver dams, and submerged rocks are always a point of concern.

References

External links

USGS Information about Big Bureau Creek

Rivers of Bureau County, Illinois
Tributaries of the Illinois River
Rivers of Illinois